SARM Division No. 2 is a division of the Saskatchewan Association of Rural Municipalities (SARM) within the province of Saskatchewan, Canada.  It is located in the south central area of the province. The current director for division 2 is Norm Nordgulen.

List of Rural Municipalities in Division No. 2

 RM No. 8 Lake Alma
 RM No. 9 Surprise Valley
 RM No. 10 Happy Valley
 RM No. 11 Hart Butte
 RM No. 12 Poplar Valley
 RM No. 38 Laurier
 RM No. 39 The Gap
 RM No. 40 Bengough
 RM No. 42 Willow Bunch
 RM No. 43 Old Post
 RM No. 44 Waverley
 RM No. 68 Brokenshell
 RM No. 69 Norton
 RM No. 70 Key West
 RM No. 71 Excel
 RM No. 72 Lake of the Rivers
 RM No. 73 Stonehenge
 RM No. 74 Wood River
 RM No. 98 Scott
 RM No. 99 Caledonia
 RM No. 100 Elmsthorpe
 RM No. 101 Terrell
 RM No. 102 Lake Johnston
 RM No. 103 Sutton
 RM No. 104 Gravelbourg
 RM No. 128 Lajord
 RM No. 129 Bratt's Lake
 RM No. 130 Redburn
 RM No. 131 Baildon
 RM No. 132 Hillsborough
 RM No. 133 Rodgers
 RM No. 134 Shamrock
 RM No. 158 Edenwold
 RM No. 159 Sherwood
 RM No. 160 Pense
 RM No. 161 Moose Jaw
 RM No. 162 Caron
 RM No. 163 Wheatlands
 RM No. 164 Chaplin
 RM No. 189 Lumsden
 RM No. 190 Dufferin
 RM No. 191 Marquis
 RM No. 193 Eyebrow
 RM No. 194 Enfield
 RM No. 218 Cupar
 RM No. 219 Longlaketon
 RM No. 220 McKillop
 RM No. 221 Sarnia
 RM No. 222 Craik
 RM No. 223 Huron
 RM No. 224 Maple Bush

See also
Census division No. 2

Footnotes

External links
SARM Division No. 2 members

SARM divisions of Saskatchewan